Rae/Edzo Airport  is located  southwest of Behchokǫ̀, Northwest Territories, Canada.

References

Registered aerodromes in the North Slave Region